Up All Night is a compilation album by Nile Rodgers and The Chic Organization, released in 2013. It contains recordings written, played and produced by Rodgers and Bernard Edwards for various artists including Sister Sledge, Diana Ross, Sheila & B. Devotion, Deborah Harry, Norma Jean Wright, Carly Simon, Johnny Mathis and their own group Chic. In its original form, the album included every UK Top 40 hit single produced by Chic, excepting remixes. The Johnny Mathis track was widely publicised as being previously unreleased, though it had in fact appeared on Mathis' own Ultimate Collection CD in 2011.

The album was released in the UK and Europe at a time when interest in Rodgers and CHIC was high for various reasons: the publication of Rodgers' autobiography in 2011, the appearance of BBC television and radio documentaries about him, the popularity of his collaboration with Daft Punk, "Get Lucky" (which is referenced in the compilation's title and sleeve art), and a series of acclaimed live performances including one televised from the Glastonbury Festival on the weekend before the album's release.

Most of the tracks featured are 12" versions and are mastered to match the pitch and tempo of the original vinyl releases; this resulted in some tracks having slightly shorter running times than on other CD issues.

Up All Night reached number 2 in the UK Compilation Albums Chart for the week ending 13 July 2013.

Track listing
All tracks written and produced by Bernard Edwards and Nile Rodgers, and are the original album versions unless otherwise noted.

CD1
 "Le Freak" - Chic
 "He's The Greatest Dancer" - Sister Sledge
 "Upside Down" - Diana Ross
 "Everybody Dance" (12" Version) - Chic
 "We Are Family" - Sister Sledge
 "Spacer" (12" Version) - Sheila & B. Devotion
 "I Want Your Love" - Chic
 "Lost In Music" - Sister Sledge
 "Saturday" - Norma Jean Wright
 "Dance, Dance, Dance (Yowsah, Yowsah, Yowsah)" - Chic
 "Got To Love Somebody" - Sister Sledge
 "My Feet Keep Dancing" - Chic

CD2
 "Good Times" - Chic
 "I'm Coming Out" - Diana Ross
 "Why" (12" Version) - Carly Simon
 "My Forbidden Lover" (12" Version) - Chic
 "Thinking Of You" - Sister Sledge
 "I Love My Lady" - Johnny Mathis
 "Backfired" (12' Remix) - Debbie Harry
 "Soup for One" (12" Version) - Chic
 "High Society" (12" Version) - Norma Jean Wright
 "Reach Your Peak" (12" Version) - Sister Sledge
 "Your Love Is Good" (12" Remix Version) - Sheila
 "My Old Piano" - Diana Ross
 "Chic Cheer" - Chic

The Disco Edition

A second version of the album was released in October 2013, omitting some of the less well-known tracks in favour of three UK number one hits produced by Nile Rodgers, a new megamix and a live medley taken from Chic's performance at the 2013 Glastonbury Festival.

CD1
 "Le Freak" - Chic
 "He's The Greatest Dancer" - Sister Sledge
 "Upside Down" - Diana Ross
 "Everybody Dance" (12" Version) - Chic
 "We Are Family" - Sister Sledge
 "Spacer" (12" Version) - Sheila & B. Devotion
 "I Want Your Love" - Chic
 "Saturday" - Norma Jean Wright
 "Dance, Dance, Dance (Yowsah, Yowsah, Yowsah)" - Chic
 "Lost In Music" - Sister Sledge
 "My Feet Keep Dancing" - Chic
 "My Old Piano" - Diana Ross
 "Chic Cheer" - Chic

CD2
 "Good Times" - Chic
 "I'm Coming Out" - Diana Ross
 "Why" (12" Version) - Carly Simon
 "My Forbidden Lover" (12" Version) - Chic
 "Thinking Of You" - Sister Sledge
 "I Love My Lady" - Johnny Mathis
 "Your Love Is Good" (12" Remix Version) - Sheila
 "Like a Virgin" (Extended Dance Mix) – Madonna
 "Frankie" – Sister Sledge
 "The Reflex (7″ Remix)" – Duran Duran 
 "The Chic MiniMix" – The Chic Organization
 "Medley: Lady (Hear Me Tonight)/Like a Virgin/Notorious/Let's Dance/Rapper's Delight/Good Times" (Live at Glastonbury 2013) – Chic featuring Nile Rodgers

Chic (band) compilation albums
Albums produced by Nile Rodgers
Albums produced by Bernard Edwards
2013 compilation albums